Leyton was a parliamentary constituency in the United Kingdom, centred on the town of Leyton in North-East London. It returned one Member of Parliament (MP) to the House of Commons of the Parliament of the United Kingdom, elected by the first-past-the-post system.

History
The constituency was created for the 1950 general election, and abolished for the 1997 general election, when it was partly replaced by the new Leyton and Wanstead  constituency.

Boundaries
1950–1974: The Municipal Borough of Leyton. Note: abolished 1965. Remained same zone in successor: London Borough of Waltham Forest.

1974–1983: The London Borough of Waltham Forest wards of Cann Hall, Central, Forest, Lea Bridge, Leyton, and Leytonstone.

1983–1997: The London Borough of Waltham Forest wards of Cann Hall, Cathall, Forest, Grove Green, Lea Bridge, Leyton, and Leytonstone.

Members of Parliament

Elections

Elections in the 1950s

Elections in the 1960s

Elections in the 1970s

Elections in the 1980s

Election in the 1990s

See also
List of parliamentary constituencies in London

References
British Parliamentary by-elections: Leyton
UK General Elections since 1832

Parliamentary constituencies in London (historic)
Constituencies of the Parliament of the United Kingdom established in 1950
Constituencies of the Parliament of the United Kingdom disestablished in 1997
Leyton